The Pratt & Whitney R-2800 Double Wasp is an American twin-row, 18-cylinder, air-cooled radial aircraft engine with a displacement of , and is part of the long-lived Wasp family of engines. 
 
The R-2800 saw widespread use in many important American aircraft during and after World War II. During the war years, Pratt & Whitney continued to develop new ideas to upgrade the engine, including water injection for takeoff in cargo and passenger planes and to give emergency power in combat.

Design and development

First run in 1937, near the time that the larger  competing 18-cylinder Wright Duplex-Cyclone's development had been started in May of that year, the   displacement R-2800 was first-flown by 1940, one year before the Duplex-Cyclone. The Double Wasp was much smaller in displacement than either of the other 18-cylinder designs, and heat dissipation was a greater problem. To enable more efficient cooling, the usual practice of casting or forging the cylinder head cooling fins that had been effective enough for other engine designs was discarded, and instead, much thinner and closer-pitched cooling fins were machined from the solid metal of the cylinder-head forging. The fins were all cut at the same time by a gang of milling saws, automatically guided as it fed across the head in such a way that the bottom of the grooves rose and fell to make the roots of the fins follow the contour of the head, with the elaborate process substantially increasing the surface area of the fins. The twin distributors on the Double Wasp were prominently mounted on the upper surface of the forward gear reduction housing - with one of the pair of magnetos mounted between them on most models - and almost always prominently visible within a cowling, with the conduits for the spark plug wires emerging from the distributors' cases either directly forward or directly behind them, or on the later C-series R-2800s with the two-piece gear reduction housings, on the "outboard" sides of the distributor casings.

 
The design of conventional air-cooled radial engines had become so scientific and systematic by then that the Double Wasp was introduced with a smaller incremental power increase than was typical of earlier engines. Even more was coaxed from experimental models, with fan-cooled subtypes like the R-2800-57 producing , but in general the R-2800 was a rather highly developed powerplant right from the beginning.

The R-2800 powered several types of fighters and medium bombers during the war, including the US Navy's Vought F4U Corsair, with the XF4U-1 first prototype Corsair becoming the first airframe to fly (as originally designed) with the Double Wasp in its XR-2800-4 prototype version on May 29, 1940, and the first single-engine American fighter plane to exceed  in level flight during October 1940. The R-2800 also powered the Corsair's naval rival, the Grumman F6F Hellcat, the US Army Air Forces' Republic P-47 Thunderbolt (which uniquely, for single-engined aircraft, used a General Electric turbocharger), the twin-engine Martin B-26 Marauder and Douglas A-26 Invader, as well as the first purpose-built twin-engine radar-equipped night fighter, the Northrop P-61 Black Widow. When the US entered the war in December 1941, designs advanced rapidly, and long-established engines such as the Wright Cyclone and Double Wasp were re-rated on fuel of much higher octane rating (anti-knock value) to give considerably more power.

After World War II, the engine was used in the Korean War, and surplus World War II aircraft powered by the Double Wasp served with other countries well past the Korean War, some being retired as late as the latter part of the 1960s when the aircraft were replaced.

Peacetime
Engines grow in power with development, but a major war demands the utmost performance from engines fitted to aircraft whose life in front-line service was unlikely to exceed 50 hours flying, over a period of only a month or two. In peacetime however, the call was for reliability over a period of perhaps a dozen years, and the R-2800's reliability commended its use for long-range patrol aircraft and for the Douglas DC-6, Martin 4-0-4, and Convair 240 transports. The last two were twin-engine aircraft of size, passenger capacity, and high wing loading comparable to the DC-4 - itself usually powered by the R-2000 bored-out version of the Twin Wasp - and the first Constellations, which mostly used Wright Aeronautical's large Duplex-Cyclones.

The Double Wasp still flies in restored vintage warbird aircraft displayed at air shows, and sees service worldwide on aircraft such as the Canadair CL-215 water-bomber. In addition, R-2800s continue to power Douglas DC-6 cargo and fuel-carrying aircraft in locations such as Alaska. A total of 125,334 R-2800 engines were produced between 1939 and 1960.

Variants
This is a list of representative R-2800 variants, describing some of the mechanical changes made during development of the Double Wasp. Power ratings quoted are usually maximum "military" power that the engine could generate on takeoff and at altitude; 100 Octane fuel was used, unless otherwise noted.

The R-2800 was developed and modified into a basic sequence of subtypes, "A" through "E" series, each of which indicated major internal and external modifications and improvements, such that the "E" series engines had very few parts in common with the "A".

NoteSuffixes such as -S14A-G denote engines developed for export to other countries.

Data from White (Airlife) unless otherwise noted:

Military
The dash number for each military type (e.g.: -21) was allocated to identify the complete engine model in accordance with the specification under which the engine was manufactured. Thus dash numbers did not necessarily indicate the sequence in which the engines were manufactured. For example: the -18W was a "C" series engine, built from 1945, whereas the -21 was a "B" series engine, built from 1943.

Until 1940 the armed forces adhered strictly to the convention that engines built for the Army Air Forces used engine model numbers with odd numeric suffixes (e.g.: -5), while those built for the US Navy used even (e.g.: -8). After 1940, however, in the interests of standardization, engines were sometimes built to a joint Army-Navy contract, in which case the engines used a common numeric suffix (e.g. the -10 was used by both Army and Navy aircraft.)

The suffix W e.g.: -10W denotes a sub-series modified to use water injection. The "Anti-Detonant Injection" (ADI) system injected a mixture of water and methanol into the carburetor to increase power for short periods. Several models of the R-2800s were fitted with ADI as standard  equipment and were not given the W suffix. Few commercial aircraft used water injection.

"A" Series:
 R-2800-1
Production prototype of "A" series engines with the first flight test July 29, 1939. Single-speed two-stage supercharger. Production = 2 (P&W). Tested in Vultee YA-19B.
 R-2800-5
Main production "A" series engine used in Martin B-26A, early B series and XB-26D and Curtiss C-55/XC-46. Production = 1,429 (P&W 475, Ford 954.)
 R-2800-39 - 

"B" Series:

 R-2800-8
First series production "B" Series engine using a two-stage, two-speed supercharger and with internal engineering changes resulting in increased power and reliability. Updraft Bendix-Stromberg PT-13D-4 pressure carburetor. First production engines delivered to USN November 11, 1941. Used in Brewster F3A-1, Goodyear FG-1, Vought F4U-1 and F4U-2. Production = 3,903 (P&W 2,194; Nash 1,709.)
 R-2800-8W
 WEP with water injection. First production engine using ADI equipment, major production version of -8 and used in some versions of F4U Corsair. Production = 8,668 (P&W 5,574; Nash 3,094.)
 R-2800-10 and R-2800-10W
Similar to -8 series apart from downdraft PT-13G2-10 and PT-13G6-10 (-10W) carburetor. Used in Curtiss XP-60E, Grumman F6F-3 (-10; late production -10W) and F6F-5 (-10W) series  and Northrop XP-61, YP-61, and P-61A-1. Production = 4,621 -10 (P&W 2,931; Nash 1,690) and 12,940 -10W (P&W 3,040; Nash 9,900); Total = 17,561.
 R-2800-21
First production variant fed by a General Electric C-1 turbosupercharger. Designed for use in the Republic P-47B, C, D, G and XP-47F and K. Production = 5,720 (P&W 1,049; Ford 4,671.)
 R-2800-25 -   — for Northrop P-61 Black Widow
 R-2800-27 - 
 R-2800-31 - 
 R-2800-41 - 
 R-2800-43 - 
 R-2800-51 - 
 R-2800-59
Main production variant used in P-47 series, fed by an improved C-23 turbosupercharger. Differed from -21 in being fitted with ADI and a General Electric ignition system with a simplified tubular ignition harness developed by the Scintilla company in partnership with Bendix. Used in P-47C and D, XP-47L. Production = 11,391 (P&W 592; Ford 10,799).
 R-2800-59W - 
 R-2800-65 - 
 R-2800-65W - 
 R-2800-71 - 
 R-2800-75 - 
 R-2800-79 - 

"C" Series

 R-2800-18W
First series production variant of the "C" Series, which was a complete redesign of the R-2800. Some of the main changes were: forged rather than cast cylinders, allowing an increased compression ratio (from 6.65:1 to 6.75:1); a redesigned crankshaft; a single piece (rather than split) crankcase center section; a two section nose casing, incorporating hydraulically operated torque-monitoring equipment and an automatic vacuum-operated spark-advance unit. The supercharger used fluid coupling for the second stage. Updraft Bendix-Stromberg PT-13G2-10 carburetor. Used in Vought F4U-4 and -4 variants. Production = 3,257 (P&W).

 R-2800-22W - 
 R-2800-34 - 
 R-2800-34W - ,  with water-methanol injection
 R-2800-44 - 
 R-2800-44W - 
 R-2800-48 - 
 R-2800-48W - 
 R-2800-52W - 
 R-2800-54 - 
 R-2800-57 - 
 R-2800-57C - 
 R-2800-73 -  — with General Electric CH-5-A3 turbocharger for P-61C Black Widow
 R-2800-77 - 
 R-2800-83 - 
 R-2800-83AM - 
 R-2800-99W - 
 R-2800-103W - 
 R-2800-2SB-G - 
 R-2800-CB16 - , 
 R-2800-CB17 - 
 R-2800-S1A4-G - 
 R-2800-S1C3-G - 

"D" Series:
 R-2800-23 - 
 R-2800-29 - 

"E" Series:
 R-2800-30W  - ,  with water-methanol injection — with variable speed single-stage supercharger for Grumman F8F-2 Bearcat
 R-2800-32W  - ,  with water-methanol injection — with variable speed two-stage supercharger for Vought F4U-5 Corsair

Applications

The following is a partial list of aircraft that were powered by the R-2800 (and a few prototypes that utilized it at one point):

Engines on display

 There is an R-2800-39 on display at the New England Air Museum, Bradley International Airport, Windsor Locks, CT.
 An R-2800 used on Finnair Convair Metropolitan is on public display at Helsinki Airport.
 An R-2800 Double Wasp is on display at the Aerospace Discovery at the Florida Air Museum.
 An R-2800 Double Wasp manufactured by Ford Motor Company is on display at the Yankee Air Museum Belleville, Michigan
 An R-2800-8W Double Wasp is on display at the Flying Leatherneck Aviation Museum at MCAS Miramar, California.
 An R-2800 Double Wasp moving cut-away is on display at the USS Midway Museum at San Diego, California.
 An R-2800 Double Wasp is on display at (The National Museum of WWII Aviation) located in (Colorado Springs, Colorado).
 An R-2800-34 Double Wasp is on public at the Aerospace Museum of California.
 Two R-2800 Double Wasps are displayed alongside a B-25 at the Girua Airport, Popondetta, Oro Province, Papua New Guinea.

Specifications (R-2800-54)

See also

References

Footnotes

Citations

Bibliography

External links

 Pratt & Whitney's R-2800 page

1930s aircraft piston engines
Aircraft air-cooled radial piston engines
R-2800